Geoffrey Standing Bear is Principal Chief of the Osage Nation headquartered in Pawhuska, Oklahoma in the Osage Hills. The executive branch is headed by a Principal Chief, followed by an Assistant Principal Chief. The current Principal Chief is Geoffrey Standing Bear, and Raymond Red Corn is the Assistant Principal Chief, who were both sworn in on July 2, 2014. Administrative offices also fall under this executive .

Early life and education
Chief Standing Bear is a native Oklahoman who attended Bishop Kelley High School in Tulsa, Oklahoma and the University of Tulsa College of Law.

Political career
Standing Bear took office as Principal Chief of the Osage Nation in 2014 after the previous chief, John D. Red Eagle was impeached, succeeding Scott Bighorse in the role. 
Under his administration, the Osage Nation's landholdings have increased by more than 50,000 acres, including the tribe's purchase of the 43,000 acre Bluestem Ranch in historic Osage territory from Ted Turner. The tribe has also developed a $160 million casino in Tulsa, Oklahoma, new educational and language preservation initiatives and two community centers. The tribe has also challenged the Oklahoma Attorney General's office with regard to tribal sovereignty and water/mineral rights.

References

Living people
Osage Nation politicians
University of Tulsa College of Law alumni
Osage Nation
Osage people
Oklahoma lawyers
Lawyers from Tulsa, Oklahoma
Year of birth missing (living people)